Fatezh is a town and the administrative center of Fatezhsky District in Kursk Oblast, Russia, located on the Usozha River  north of Kursk, the administrative center of the oblast. Population:  4,959 (1897).

History and etymology
It was founded as a village in the 17th century and granted town status in 1779. Fatezh took its name from a local stream; the etymology is uncertain, but it may be based on the given names Foty or Iosafat in diminutive form (place names in -ezh are common in the region). During World War II, Fatezh was occupied by German troops from October 22, 1941 to February 7, 1943.

Administrative and municipal status
Within the framework of administrative divisions, Fatezh serves as the administrative center of Fatezhsky District. As an administrative division, it is incorporated within Fatezhsky District as the town of district significance of Fatezh. As a municipal division, the town of district significance of Fatezh is incorporated within Fatezhsky Municipal District as Fatezh Urban Settlement.

Literary references
In Vasily Narezhny's 1814 novel A Russian Gil Blas, the picaresque hero leaves his home village in Kursk Governorate to go to Moscow; after two weeks of traveling he reaches a magnificent city he is sure must be Moscow, but when he asks a passing policeman it turns out to be Fatezh.

Notable residents
Fatezh is the birthplace of composer Georgy Sviridov.

References

Notes

Sources

External links

Official website of Fatezh 
Fatezh Business Directory 

Cities and towns in Kursk Oblast
Fatezhsky Uyezd
1779 establishments in the Russian Empire